Daniela Romina Bermúdez (born 7 July 1989) is an Argentine professional boxer. She is a former world champion in three weight classes, having held the WBO female bantamweight title twice between 2013 and 2020; the WBO female super flyweight title from 2014 to 2017; and the IBF female junior featherweight title twice between 2018 and 2020. She is the older sister of former light flyweight world champion of boxing, Evelyn Nazarena Bermúdez.

As of September 2020, she is ranked as the world's best active female bantamweight by The Ring and second by BoxRec, as well as the eighth best active female, pound for pound, by The Ring and ESPN, and tenth by BoxRec.

Early life 
Daniela Romina Bermúdez was born on 7 July 1989 in Rosario, Santa Fe, Argentina. She comes from a fighting family where three of her five siblings are fellow boxers; Roxana, Gustavo and IBF light-flyweight champion, Evelyn. The family own a gym called Bermúdez Boxing Club in Villa Gobernador Gálvez, Santa Fe.

Professional career 
Bermúdez made her professional debut on 26 March 2010, scoring a four-round split decision (SD) victory over Roxana Virginia Baron at the Estadio Pedro Estremador in Bariloche, Argentina. She fought a further four times in 2010; a knockout (KO) win over Maria Terriaza in April; two consecutive majority draws (MD) against Betiana Patricia Vinas in July and October; and a four-round unanimous decision (UD) win over Graciela Ines De Luca in November.

She began 2011 with a unanimous decision win over Cristina del Valle Pacheco in February, followed by a ten-round unanimous decision loss to Edith Soledad Matthysse in April and a six-round majority decision (MD) win in a rematch with Matthysse in August. A month later she made her first attempt at a world title by challenging reigning WBA light-flyweight champion Yésica Bopp on 24 September at the Polideportivo Posta del Retamo in Junín, Argentina. Bermúdez lost via unanimous decision over ten rounds, with the judges' scorecards reading 100–90, 97–94 and 96–94. Bermúdez ended the year with a six-round unanimous decision victory over Norma Elizabeth Diaz Caucota in November.

Following a second-round technical knockout (TKO) win over Marta Soledad Juncos in January 2012, she faced Mayerlin Rivas on 31 March at Club Atlético Talleres in Villa Gonernador Gálvez, Argentina, with the vacant WBA interim bantamweight title on the line. Bermúdez captured the interim title by majority decision over ten rounds. One judge scored the bout a draw at 95–95, while the other two scored it 95–94 and 96–94 in favour of Bermúdez.

Two months after winning the WBA interim bantamweight title, she moved down a weight class to fight Judith Rodriguez on 12 May at Club America in Buenos Aires, this time for the vacant WBA interim super-flyweight title. Bermúdez won the bout via ten-round unanimous decision, with the scorecards reading 99–91, 97–94 and 96–94. She fought another two times in 2012; a successful defence of her interim super-flyweight title via second-round technical knockout against Olga Julio in August and a unanimous decision victory over Anahi Yolanda Salles in a six-round non-title bout in December.

She defended the title twice in 2013 – with unanimous decision victories over Romina Alcantara in February and Guadalupe Martínez Guzmán in April – before moving up in weight to face Neisi Torres for the vacant WBO bantamweight title on 31 May, at the Gimnasio Pedro Estremador in Bariloche. Bermúdez won the bout by first-round technical knockout to capture her first full world title. She moved back down to super-flyweight for her last fight of 2013; defeating Judith Rodriguez for a second time in September by unanimous decision in defence of her WBA interim title.

Her first fight of 2014 came on January 4, against Linda Laura Lecca for the vacant WBO super-flyweight title at Piso de los Deportes in Buenos Aires. Bermúdez won the fight via eighth-round technical knockout to become a two-weight world champion. Three months later, she moved down in weight to face former conqueror Yésica Bopp for the vacant WBO flyweight title. The bout was held on 26 April 2014 at the Polideportivo Carlos Magalot in Río Grande. Bermúdez failed in her attempt to become a three-weight world champion, losing by unanimous decision. Two judges scored the bout 97–93 while the third scored it 98–92.

Following the loss to Bopp, Bermùdez moved back up to super-flyweight to successfully defend her WBO title against Vanesa Lorena Taborda in January 2015, winning by majority decision. Her second and last fight of 2015 was against Tomomi Tanaka in November, fighting for the first time outside of Argentina at the Korakuen Hall in Tokyo, Japan. Bermúdez retained her title via fourth-round knockout.

She scored three unanimous decision victories in 2016; against Paola Pamela Benavidez in an eight-round non-title bout in May; a WBO super-flyweight defence against Marisa Joana Portillo in June; and a ten-round non-title bout against Mariana Juárez in August which served as a final eliminator for the WBC bantamweight title.

She next faced Paola Pamela Benavidez in a rematch in June 2017 – fighting to a split decision draw to retain her WBO super-flyweight title – before moving up in weight to face Soledad del Valle Frias for the vacant WBO bantamweight title on 20 October 2017. The fight was held at Estadio Olímpico in Palpalá, Argentina. Bermúdez won by a shutout unanimous decision, becoming a two-weight world champion on her second try. All three judges scored the bout 100–90.

Six months later, Bermúdez moved up in weight yet again, challenging reigning IBF junior-featherweight champion Marcela Acuña on 13 April 2018 at the Microestadio Municipal in Buenos Aires. Bermúdez won by unanimous decision to become a three-weight world champion, with the judges' scorecards reading 98–92, 97–93 and 96–94. She fought once more in 2018, moving back down to bantamweight to successfully defend her WBO title with a fourth-round corner retirement (RTD) win over Yolis Marrugo Franco.

Bermúdez defended the title twice more in 2019; a unanimous decision win over Irma Garcia in March and an eighth-round corner retirement win against Valeria Perez in July.

Professional boxing record

References

External links

Living people
1989 births
Argentine women boxers
Sportspeople from Santa Fe, Argentina
Light-flyweight boxers
Flyweight boxers
Super-flyweight boxers
Bantamweight boxers
Super-bantamweight boxers
World Boxing Organization champions
International Boxing Federation champions